A referendum on the Trade, Commerce and Industry Regulations Act was held in Liechtenstein on 12 June 1949. The Act had been passed by the Landtag, but was rejected by 78.4% of voters.

Results

References

1949 referendums
1949 in Liechtenstein
Referendums in Liechtenstein
June 1949 events in Europe